Synersaga pseudocathra is a moth in the family Lecithoceridae. It is found in Myanmar.

References

Moths described in 1951
pseudocathra